The 2012 PTT Thailand Open was a men's tennis tournament played on indoor hard courts. It was the 10th edition of the Thailand Open, and part of the ATP World Tour 250 Series of the 2012 ATP World Tour. It took place at the Impact Arena in Bangkok, Thailand, from 22 September through 30 September 2012. Richard Gasquet won the singles title.

Singles main-draw entrants

Seeds

* Seeds are based on the rankings of September 17, 2012

Other entrants
The following players received wildcards into the singles main draw:
  Marco Chiudinelli
  Peerakiat Siriluethaiwattana
  Danai Udomchoke

The following players received entry from the qualifying draw:
  Kevin Anderson
  Hiroki Moriya
  Yūichi Sugita
  Yang Tsung-hua

Withdrawals
  Jérémy Chardy
  Blaž Kavčič
  Mikhail Kukushkin

Retirements
  Yūichi Sugita (right ankle injury)

Doubles main-draw entrants

Seeds

 Rankings are as of September 17, 2012

Other entrants
The following pairs received wildcards into the doubles main draw:
  Sanchai Ratiwatana /  Sonchat Ratiwatana
  Lu Yen-hsun /  Danai Udomchoke

Finals

Singles

 Richard Gasquet defeated  Gilles Simon, 6–2, 6–1

Doubles

 Lu Yen-hsun /  Danai Udomchoke defeated  Eric Butorac /  Paul Hanley, 6–3, 6–4

References

External links
 Official website

 
 ATP World Tour
Thailand Open
Tennis, ATP World Tour, PTT Thailand Open

Tennis, ATP World Tour, PTT Thailand Open